Brain Drain is a fictional character appearing in American comic books published by Marvel Comics.

Publication history

Brain Drain first appears in The Invaders #2 (Oct. 1975) and was created by writer Roy Thomas and artist Frank Robbins.

Fictional character biography
Werner Schmidt first appears as Brain Drain in the title Invaders, leading a group of beings claiming to be Teutonic gods against World War II superhero team the Invaders. Brain Drain recounts in flashback his origin to Captain America, explaining how a falling meteorite all but killed him. The "meteorite" was in fact a spaceship, with the four alien inhabitants saving Schmidt's brain and eyes and placing them in a robot body. With his brain waves heightened during the process, Schmidt dubs himself "Brain Drain" and taking mental control of the aliens - which he calls "Star Gods" - renames them after old German gods: Donar, Log, Froh, and Brunnhilde. When Brunnhilde is released, she taunts Brain Drain into committing suicide in a vat of chemicals, which destroy the characters. The Invaders escape as the aliens then destroy themselves and the installation.

The character is mentioned by fellow Nazi villain Red Skull in the title Marvel Premiere, and reappears in a two-part story in the title Marvel Two-In-One, and together with Nazi allies Master Man, U-Man and Skyshark plans to sabotage New York City with a new super weapon. The plan, however, is foiled by time-travelling Fantastic Four member the Thing and the Liberty Legion.

The title Alpha Flight reveals that Brain Drain's brain casing is apparently lost in the snow below a mountain for decades, and is rescued after taking mental control of a nearby hiker. The character allies himself with the Master, a perennial foe of the superhero team Alpha Flight. Joining the Master's team Omega Flight in a new robot body, Brain Drain and other villains battle the heroes on several occasions, before finally being defeated.

Brain Drain is mentioned in the one shot Miss America Comics 70th Anniversary Special, as heroine Miss America believes the character to be the mastermind behind a Nazi plan.

Brain Drain returns as an antagonist in The Unbeatable Squirrel Girl and is quickly defeated due to his extremely outdated technology (such as vacuum tubes) and crucial design flaws (specifically exposed wires). Upon realizing that Brain Drain did not have a choice about his evil actions due to his programming, Squirrel Girl and her roommate Nancy Whitehead updated his technology to modern standards. Upon awakening, he reveals that he intended to reform and was specifically seeking Squirrel Girl's help, after which he decides to audit computer science courses at Empire State University, under the human name "Brian Drayne". Afterwards, he takes the recurring role as one of Squirrel Girl's superhero friends.

Powers and abilities
Werner Schmidt was a brilliant scientist. After his brain was transplanted into a robot body by aliens, Brain Drain gained the power of mind control.

References

External links
 
 AlphaFlight.Net Alphanex Entry on - Brain Drain

Characters created by Frank Robbins
Characters created by Roy Thomas
Comics characters introduced in 1975
Marvel Comics Nazis
Marvel Comics superheroes
Marvel Comics supervillains